The Royal Delta Stakes is a Grade III American Thoroughbred horse race for fillies and mares that are four years old or older, over a distance of  miles on the dirt  held annually in February at Gulfstream Park in Hallandale Beach, Florida.  The event currently carries a purse of $150,000.

History

The inaugural running of the event was on 17 February 1991 as the Sabin Breeders' Cup Handicap over a distance of  miles and was won by Fit for a Queen who was ridden by US Hall of Fame jockey Jerry Bailey and trained by US Hall of Fame trainer Shug McGaughey in a time of 1:42.50.
 
The event was named in honor for Henryk de Kwiatkowski's multiple Grade I stakes-winning filly Sabin and winner of the 1984 Orchid Handicap at this track where this event is held. Born in 1980, she made 25 starts and won 18 of them. 

The event was classified as Grade III in 1994.  In 2009 the conditions of the event were changed to stakes allowances and the race was run as the Sabin Stakes. 

Royal Delta, winner of Breeders' Cup Ladies' Classic in 2011 and 2012 won this race in 2013 easily by 5 lengths as the 2/5on favorite. In 2015, Gulfstream Park renamed the race after the three-time Eclipse Award winner to the Royal Delta Stakes.  

This race was upgraded to a Grade II event for its 2014 running but returned to Grade III status in 2018.

The event has had numerous distance changes which can be viewed in the winner's table in the Winners section of this article.

Records
Speed record: 
 miles – 1:41:00  Devil's Cave    (2014)
 1 mile – 1:35.18   Blamed  (2019)
 1 mile & 70 yards – 1:39.57  Hunzinga (1994)
 miles – 1:50.49   Taittinger Rose     (2006)

Margins: 
 8 lengths – Awesome Maria (2012) 

Most wins:
 2 – Awesome Maria (2011, 2012)

Most wins by a jockey:
 4 – John Velazquez (2004, 2005, 2011, 2012)

Most wins by a trainer:
 4 – Todd Pletcher (2005, 2011, 2012, 2023)

Most wins by an owner:
 2 – Joseph Allen  (1997, 2004)
 2 – Hobeau Farm   (1998, 2007)
 2 – Richard, Bertram & Elaine Klein (2001, 2003)
 2 – E. Paul Robsham Stables  (2011, 2012)

Winners

See also
List of American and Canadian Graded races

References

Horse races in Florida
Graded stakes races in the United States
Recurring sporting events established in 1991
1991 establishments in Florida
Grade 3 stakes races in the United States
Gulfstream Park